Hinton Hill, Wellow is a 0.25 hectare geological Site of Special Scientific Interest (SSSI) near the village of Wellow in Somerset, notified in 1996.

The site is of importance to studies of the stratigraphy of the Middle Jurassic of the Bath district, and the British Bathonian as a whole.

Hinton Hill, Wellow is governed by a local planning authority named Bath and North East Somerset and is named as a Site of Special Scientific Interest.

References

Sites of Special Scientific Interest in Avon
Sites of Special Scientific Interest notified in 1996